Samuel Jameson Gholson (May 19, 1808 – October 16, 1883) was a United States representative from Mississippi, a United States district judge of the United States District Court for the Northern District of Mississippi and the United States District Court for the Southern District of Mississippi and a General in the Confederate States Army.

Education and career

Born on May 19, 1808, near Richmond in Madison County, Kentucky, Gholson moved with his father to Franklin County, Alabama and attended the common schools. He read law and was admitted to the bar at Russellville, Alabama in 1829. He entered private practice in Athens, Monroe County, Mississippi from 1830 to 1839. He was a member of the Mississippi House of Representatives from 1835 to 1836, and in 1839.

Congressional service

Gholson was elected as a Jacksonian Democrat (now Democrat) from Mississippi's at-large congressional district to the United States House of Representatives of the 24th United States Congress to fill the vacancy caused by the death of United States Representative David Dickson and served from December 1, 1836, to March 3, 1837. He presented credentials as a Democratic member-elect to the 25th United States Congress and served from July 18, 1837, until February 5, 1838, when the seat was declared vacant.

Federal judicial service

Gholson was nominated by President Martin Van Buren on February 9, 1839, to a joint seat on the United States District Court for the Northern District of Mississippi and the United States District Court for the Southern District of Mississippi vacated by Judge George Adams. He was confirmed by the United States Senate on February 13, 1839, and received his commission the same day. His service terminated on January 10, 1861, due to his resignation upon the secession of Mississippi from the Union. Gholson was a member of the Mississippi secession convention in 1861.

Other service

Concurrent with his federal judicial service, Gholson served in the Mississippi State Militia as a lieutenant in 1846.

Later career and death

During the American Civil War, Gholson served in the Confederate States Army as a private, captain, colonel, brigadier general, and major general of state troops. He became brigadier general of the Confederate States Army in June 1863, and was placed in command of a brigade of cavalry. He was a member of the Mississippi House of Representatives from 1865 to 1866, and in 1878. He was its Speaker in the 1865-1866 session, the last session before 1870. He resumed private practice in Aberdeen, Mississippi from 1866 to 1878, and from 1878 to 1883. He died on October 16, 1883, in Aberdeen. He was interred in Odd Fellows Cemetery in Aberdeen.

See also

 List of American Civil War generals (Confederate)

References

Sources
 Eicher, John H., and David J. Eicher, Civil War High Commands. Stanford: Stanford University Press, 2001. .
 Sifakis, Stewart. Who Was Who in the Civil War. New York: Facts On File, 1988. .

 Warner, Ezra J. Generals in Gray: Lives of the Confederate Commanders. Baton Rouge: Louisiana State University Press, 1959. .

1808 births
1883 deaths
Judges of the United States District Court for the Northern District of Mississippi
Judges of the United States District Court for the Southern District of Mississippi
United States federal judges appointed by Martin Van Buren
19th-century American judges
Confederate States Army generals
People of Mississippi in the American Civil War
Mississippi lawyers
People from Madison County, Kentucky
People from Monroe County, Mississippi
People from Franklin County, Alabama
Jacksonian members of the United States House of Representatives from Mississippi
Democratic Party members of the United States House of Representatives from Mississippi
19th-century American politicians
United States federal judges admitted to the practice of law by reading law